Xavier Pinson (born June 23, 2000) is an American college basketball player who plays for the New Mexico State Aggies. He previously played for the Missouri Tigers and LSU Tigers of the Southeastern Conference (SEC).

High school career
Pinson attended St. Patrick High School in Chicago, Illinois. He stood 5'1" as a freshman and made the varsity team in his following year. He transferred to Simeon Career Academy in Chicago, Illinois for his senior season, joining Talen Horton-Tucker. Pinson averaged 11.9 points and 3.8 assists per game, helping his team win Class 4A sectional and Chicago Public League titles. He originally committed to playing college basketball for Kent State before reopening his recruitment. A three-star recruit, Pinson committed to Missouri over offers from Georgetown and Wisconsin.

College career
As a freshman at Missouri, Pinson averaged 6.6 points, 2.6 rebounds and 2.3 assists per game. On February 18, 2020, he scored a sophomore season-high 32 points in a 71–68 win over Ole Miss. Pinson became one of his team's best offensive players during the month. As a sophomore, he averaged 11.1 points, 2.8 rebounds and 2.8 assists per game. He declared for the 2020 NBA draft before withdrawing his name and returning to college. On January 23, 2021, Pinson scored 27 points in a 73–64 victory over sixth-ranked Tennessee. One week later, he scored 36 points in a 102–98 overtime win over TCU. As a junior, Pinson averaged 13.6 points and 2.9 assists per game. For his senior season, he transferred to LSU.

Career statistics

College

|-
| style="text-align:left;"| 2018–19
| style="text-align:left;"| Missouri
| 31 || 12 || 18.4 || .412 || .400 || .779 || 2.6 || 2.3 || .6 || .0 || 6.6
|-
| style="text-align:left;"| 2019–20
| style="text-align:left;"| Missouri
| 31 || 11 || 24.0 || .391 || .279 || .817 || 2.8 || 2.8 || .8 || .0 || 11.1
|-
| style="text-align:left;"| 2020–21
| style="text-align:left;"| Missouri
| 26 || 26 || 25.6 || .386 || .336 || .837 || 2.7 || 2.9 || 1.1 || .0 || 13.6
|- class="sortbottom"
| style="text-align:center;" colspan="2"| Career
| 88 || 49 || 22.5 || .394 || .330 || .815 || 2.7 || 2.6 || .8 || .0 || 10.3

References

External links
LSU Tigers bio
Missouri Tigers bio

2000 births
Living people
American men's basketball players
Basketball players from Chicago
LSU Tigers basketball players
Missouri Tigers men's basketball players
Point guards